This is the complete list of Pan American Games medalists in boxing from 1951 to 2015.

Men's events

Light Flyweight 
48 kg (1971–2007)
49 kg (2011–)

Flyweight
51 kg (1951–2007)
52 kg (2011–)

Bantamweight
54 kg (1951–2007)
56 kg (2011–)

Featherweight
57 kg (1951–2007)

Lightweight
60 kg (1951–)

Light Welterweight
63,5 kg (1951–1999)
64 kg (2003–)

Welterweight
67 kg (1951–1999)
69 kg (2003–)

Light Middleweight
71 kg (1955–1999)

Middleweight
75 kg (1951–)

Light Heavyweight
81 kg (1951–)

Heavyweight
+81 kg (1951–1979)
91 kg (1983–)

Super Heavyweight
+91 kg (1983–)

Women's events

Flyweight
51 kg (2011–)

Featherweight
57 kg (2019–)

Light welterweight
60 kg (2011–)

Welterweight
69 kg (2019–)

Middleweight
75 kg (2011–)

References

Boxing
Lists of boxing champions